Fritz William Weaver (January 19, 1926 − November 26, 2016) was an American actor in television, stage, and motion pictures. He portrayed Dr. Josef Weiss in the 1978 epic television drama Holocaust, for which he was nominated for a Primetime Emmy Award. In cinema, he made his debut in the film Fail Safe (1964) and also appeared in Marathon Man (1976), Creepshow (1982), and The Thomas Crown Affair (1999). Among many television roles, he performed in the movie The Legend of Lizzie Borden (1975). He also worked in science fiction and fantasy, especially in television series and movies like The Twilight Zone, 'Way Out, Night Gallery, The X-Files, The Martian Chronicles, and Demon Seed. Weaver also narrated educational TV programs.

Early life
Weaver was born in Pittsburgh, Pennsylvania, on January 19, 1926, the son of Elsa W. Weaver (née Stringaro) and John Carson Weaver. His mother was of Italian descent and his father was a social worker from Pittsburgh with deep American roots. His brother was the illustrator Robert Weaver, and his younger sister was art director Mary Dodson.

Weaver attended the Fanny Edel Falk Laboratory School at the University of Pittsburgh as a child, followed by Peabody High School. He served in the Civilian Public Service as a conscientious objector during World War II.

Career

Following the war, Weaver worked at various jobs before turning to acting in the early 1950s. His first acting role for television came in 1956 for an episode of The United States Steel Hour. Weaver continued to act in television during the next four decades. In 1969, he appeared as Hebron Grant, a Mormon married to two women, on The Big Valley in the episode "A Passage of Saints." He also appeared in several episodes of Mission Impossible.  

He also appeared in the made-for-TV movies Holocaust (1978) and The Legend of Lizzie Borden (1975) in which he played Andrew Borden. He earned an Emmy nomination for the former; the award went to his co-star Michael Moriarty.

Weaver won the Tony Award for Best Actor in a Play and the Drama Desk Award for Outstanding Performance for the Broadway play Child's Play (1970). His other Broadway credits included The Chalk Garden (Tony nomination and Theatre World Award win), All American, Baker Street, Absurd Person Singular, “The Price,” Love Letters, and The Crucible. He appeared in the off-Broadway play Burnt Piano for the HB Playwrights Theatre, and with Uta Hagen in a television adaptation of Norman Corwin's play The World of Carl Sandburg.

Weaver also acted in motion pictures, generally as a supporting player. He appeared in such movies as Fail-Safe (1964; as a jingoist and increasingly unstable U.S. Air Force colonel, ashamed of his foreign-born and alcoholic parents, whom he refers to as "those people"), Marathon Man (1976; as a professor advising the protagonist, a graduate student), Black Sunday (1977; as the lead FBI agent in an anti-terrorism effort), Creepshow (1982; as a scientist who discovers a monster in a crate), and John McTiernan's remake of The Thomas Crown Affair (1999). He also had roles in The Day of the Dolphin (1973), Demon Seed (1977), The Big Fix (1978), and Sidney Lumet's Power (1986). Beginning in 1995, Weaver worked primarily as a voice actor, providing narration for programs on the History Channel. After making his third guest appearance on Law & Order in 2005, Weaver made a "secret decision to retire."

In 2010, Weaver was inducted into the American Theater Hall of Fame. Shortly thereafter, he came out of retirement to make an uncredited cameo in This Must Be the Place (2011), voicing the deceased father of Sean Penn's protagonist. He went on to give prominent supporting performances in the Emmy-nominated television film Muhammad Ali's Greatest Fight (2013) and the theatrically-released We'll Never Have Paris (2014), The Cobbler (2014), and The Congressman (2016).

Personal life and death
His first marriage ended in divorce. Weaver's second marriage was to actress Rochelle Oliver in 1997.  He died at his home in New York City on November 26, 2016, at the age of 90.

Select filmography

Film

To Trap a Spy (1964) – Andrew Vulcan (archive footage)
Fail Safe (1964) – Colonel Cascio
The Borgia Stick (1967) – Anderson
The Maltese Bippy (1969) – Mischa Ravenswood
A Walk in the Spring Rain (1970) – Roger Meredith
The Day of the Dolphin (1973) – Harold DeMilo
The Legend of Lizzie Borden (1975) – Andrew Borden
Marathon Man (1976) – Professor Biesenthal
Black Sunday (1977) – Corley
Demon Seed (1977) – Alex Harris
Captains Courageous (1977) – Harvey Cheyne Sr.
The Big Fix (1978) – Oscar Procari Sr.
Martian Chronicles (1980) – Father Peregrine
Nightkill (1980) – Herbert Childs
Jaws of Satan (1981) – Father Tom Farrow
Creepshow (1982) – Dexter Stanley (segment "The Crate")
Power (1986) – Wallace Furman
The Thomas Crown Affair (1999) – John Reynolds
This Must Be the Place (2011) – Cheyenne's Father (voice)
Muhammad Ali's Greatest Fight (2013) – Hugo Black
We'll Never Have Paris (2014) – Phillipe
The Cobbler (2014) – Mr. Solomon
The Congressman (2016) – Harlan Lantier (final film role)

Television

Beyond This Place (1957) – Charlie Castle
Way Out (1961, Episode: "William and Mary") – Dr. Landy
The Twilight Zone (1961, Episodes: "Third from the Sun" / "The Obsolete Man") – William Sturka / Chancellor
The Asphalt Jungle (1961) – Victor Vanda
Dr. Kildare (1963) – Arthur Hobler
The Man from U.N.C.L.E. (1964) – Andrew Vulcan
Twelve O'Clock High (1964) – Col. Peter Raff
Rawhide (1964) – Jonathan Damon
The Fugitive (1966, Season 3 Episode 28 "A Taste of Tomorrow") – Joe Tucker
Combat! (1966) – Major Chaplain Ernest Miller
Gunsmoke (1967) – Marshal Burl Masters
The Invaders (1967, Episode 30 "The Captive") – Deputy Ambassador Peter Borke
The Big Valley (1967–1969) – Hebron Grant / Burke Jordan
Cannon (1971) – "The Nowhere Man" - Leo Kern
Night Gallery (1971) – Dr. Mazi (segment "A Question of Fear")
Mission: Impossible (1966–1971) – George Berlinger / Emil Skarbeck / Erik Hagar / Imre Rogosh
Mannix (1968–1973) – William Avery / Dr. Cameron McKenzie
Kung Fu (1974) – Hillquist
Great Performances (1974) – Creon (Antigone)
The New Land (1974, Episode: "The Word is: Giving" – unaired)
The Streets Of San Francisco (1975) – Ted Whitlock
The New Adventures of Wonder Woman (1977) – Dr. Solano
Holocaust (1978) – Dr. Josef Weiss
Hawaii Five-O (1979) – Dr. Harvey Danworth
The Martian Chronicles (1980) – Father Peregrine
Magnum, P.I. (1980) – Captain J. Cooly, USN
Don't Eat the Pictures (1983) – Osiris
Tales from the Darkside (Episodes: "Comet Watch" (1986), "Inside the Closet" (1984)) – Sir Edmund Halley / Dr. Fenner
Murder, She Wrote (1984–1987) – Paris Inspector Hugues Panassié / Edwin Dupont / Judge Lambert
The Twilight Zone (1985, Episode 13; segment "The Star") – Father Matthew KarsighanDream West (1986) – Sen. Thomas Hart BentonI'll Take Manhattan (1987) – Mr. AmbervilleFriday the 13th: The Series (1989, in the two-part episode of the third-season opener named "The Prophecies") – AsterothMatlock (1989) – Pastor James HubertAll My Children (1992) – Hugo MarickStar Trek: Deep Space Nine (1994, S2:E25 "Tribunal") – KovatThe X-Files (1996) – Senator Albert SorensonFrasier (1998) – Sir Trevor AinsleyLaw & Order'' (1991–2005) – Nathan Fogg / Larry Weber / Philip Woodleigh

References

External links
 
 
 
 Fritz Weaver (Aveleyman)

1926 births
2016 deaths
American male stage actors
American male film actors
American male television actors
American male musical theatre actors
Tony Award winners
20th-century American male actors
21st-century American male actors
Male actors from Pittsburgh
American conscientious objectors
Members of the Civilian Public Service
American people of Italian descent